Delcarbon is an extinct town in Huerfano County, Colorado, United States. The GNIS classifies it as a populated place.

History
A post office called Delcarbon was established in 1915, and remained in operation until 1953.  Delcarbon is a name derived from Spanish meaning "of the coal".

See also

 List of ghost towns in Colorado

References

External links

Ghost towns in Colorado
Geography of Huerfano County, Colorado